Naucleopsis chiguila is a species of plant in the family Moraceae. It is endemic to Ecuador.

References

Flora of Ecuador
chiguila
Vulnerable plants
Taxonomy articles created by Polbot